Steve Gibbons may refer to:

 Steve Gibbons (musician) (born 1941), English singer, songwriter and musician
 Steve Gibbons (politician) (1949–2022), Australian politician
 Steve Gibbons (designer) (born 1956), British graphic designer 
 Stevie Gibbons (born 1983), Irish rugby league footballer
 Steve Gibbons, American actor appeared in Tromeo and Juliet